Watersmeet is an unincorporated community and census-designated place (CDP) in Watersmeet Township, Michigan. As of the 2010 census, the CDP had a population of 428, out of a total population in the township of 1,417. The community was platted in 1884, designated as a station of the Milwaukee Lake Shore and Western Railroad.

Geography 
The community is located in the northern part of Watersmeet Township, in the western part of Michigan's Upper Peninsula, at the confluence of Duck Creek with the Middle Branch of the Ontonagon River. U.S. Routes 2 and 45 cross at the southern edge of town; US 2 leads southeast  to Iron River and northwest  to Wakefield, while US 45 leads north  to Ontonagon on Lake Superior and south  to Eagle River, Wisconsin. The community is also served by the State Line Trail.

The community of Watersmeet was listed as a newly-organized census-designated place for the 2010 census, meaning it now has officially defined boundaries and population statistics for the first time.

Demographics

References

Census-designated places in Gogebic County, Michigan
Census-designated places in Michigan
Unincorporated communities in Gogebic County, Michigan
Unincorporated communities in Michigan